Jaliawas is situated in Rewari district, which is about 10.3 km from Rewari town. It is on Rewari-Bawal Road near Neemrana at  distance from Rewari in Bawal block.

Demographics of 2011
As of 2011 India census, Jaliawas, Rewari had a population of 1188 in 203 households. Males (614) constitute 51.68%  of the population and females (574) 48.31%. Jaliawas has an average literacy (812) rate of 68.35%, lower than the national average of 74%: male literacy (479) is 58.99%, and female literacy (333) is 41% of total literates (812). In Jaliawas, Rewari, 12.37% of the population is under 6 years of age (147).

Adjacent villages

Bawal
Bithwana
Neemrana
Karnawas
Kasola
Suthani
Naichana
Sulkha

References 

Villages in Rewari district